Cactus and a Rose is a 1980 honky tonk/Southern rock album by Country music singer Gary Stewart. The singer's seventh studio album, it only reached #49 on Billboard's "Country Albums" chart, spawning two low-charting singles: "Cactus and a Rose" (#48) and "Are We Dreamin' the Same Dream" (#66).  Produced by Chips Moman, it was a departure from his standard honky-tonk fare, as it features Southern rockers Gregg Allman, Dickey Betts, Mike Lawler, Bonnie Bramlett (from Delaney, Bonnie & Friends), and Randy Scruggs.  According to Allmusic the album proves that "Stewart could have easily fronted the Allman Brothers or Marshall Tucker or, vocally kicked Charlie Daniels' southern rock butt from here to Pascagoula as a great honky tonk singer."

Track listing 
 "Okeechobee Purple" (Chips Moman, Buddy Emmons) – 2:40
 "Cactus and a Rose" (Moman, Emmons) – 3:21
 "Staring Each Other Down" (Moman, Emmons) – 3:24
 "Lovers' Knot" (Richard Supa) – 3:58
 "Ghost Train" (Gary Stewart,  Gregg Allman) – 3:36
 "Roarin'" (Mike Lawler, Johnny Cobb) – 3:54
 "Harlan County Highway" (Stewart, Dickey Betts) – 3:53
 "Are We Dreamin' the Same Dream" (Billy Burnette, Johnny Christopher) – 4:03
 "How Could We Come to This After That" (Reynolds, Stewart) – 2:51
 "We Made It as Lovers (We Just Couldn't Make It as Friends)" (Moman, Emmons) – 2:24

Chart performance

References 

1980 albums
Gary Stewart (singer) albums
Albums produced by Chips Moman
RCA Records albums